Jon Feltheimer (born September 2, 1951) is the Chief Executive Officer of Lions Gate Entertainment and has held that position since 2000. Feltheimer has led Lionsgate to grow into the leading Canadian independent filmed entertainment studio.

Biography
Feltheimer received a BA in economics with honors from Washington University in St. Louis. He helped engineer the creation of TriStar Television for Sony Pictures Entertainment where he became the head of the Columbia TriStar Television Group and executive vice president of Sony Pictures Entertainment. At SPE he presided over the development of Forever Knight, Mad About You, The Nanny, Walker, Texas Ranger, Early Edition, Dawson's Creek, Party of Five, and The King of Queens. In 2000, he joined Lions Gate Entertainment where he served as CEO. Under his guidance, Lionsgate received 25 Academy Award nominations and seven Oscar wins including for Crash (film), the Best Picture of 2006. Lionsgate's television network, which operates 12 channels, is known for its hit TV series, Weeds. Lions gate recently announced that they will be extending Jon Feltheimer's contract until 2023.

Feltheimer also served as an advisor of ZeniMax Media and a member of Telltale Games board of directors.

Philanthropy and awards
In April 2016, Feltheimer was awarded the Wiesenthal Center's highest honor, the Humanitarian Award. He and his wife are supporters of Kehillat Israel.

Personal life
Feltheimer is married to Laurie Demarest; and has 4 children. He and his wife are members of Kehillat Israel, a Reconstructionist congregation in Pacific Palisades, Los Angeles.

References

External links
Lions gate official profile
Lionsgate Defies Expectations Variety 24 August 2007
Lionsgate Careers

1951 births
Living people
American film studio executives
American film producers
People from Brooklyn
Washington University in St. Louis alumni
Businesspeople from New York City
Jewish American philanthropists
Philanthropists from New York (state)
American chief executives
American Reconstructionist Jews
Lionsgate